Manhattan Township is located in Will County, Illinois. As of the 2010 census, its population was 9,218 and it contained 3,199 housing units. Manhattan Township was formed from the western half of Trenton Township at an unknown date.

Geography

Demographics

References

External links
City-data.com
Will County Official Site
Illinois State Archives

Townships in Will County, Illinois
Townships in Illinois